Marit Johanne Aarum (1903–1956) was a Norwegian economist, liberal politician, civil servant and feminist.

Aarum was born April 22, 1903. She studied at Royal Frederick University and received a cand.oecon. degree in 1926.

Career 
Aarum was an inspector at the Norwegian Labour Inspection Authority and served as a representative of the Norwegian government to the international Labour conference in 1948. She worked as an International Labour Organization expert in Pakistan for six months from 1952 to 1953.

Aarum became the vice president of the Norwegian Association for Women's Rights in 1952. When the organisation's president, Ingerid Gjøstein Resi, died in a plane crash in August 1955, Aarum took over as President. She remained president until her death in 1956.

During her political career, she was President of the Oslo branch of the Liberal Party and a member of the City Council of Oslo. She was a deputy member of the Norwegian Parliament representing Oslo for the Liberal Party from 1954 until her death.

Publications
 Midlertidig lov om Arbeidsvilkår for hushjelp av 3. desember 1949 : med kommentarer samt en del om Ferieloven og Syketrygdloven, 1949

References

Norwegian women's rights activists
1903 births
1956 deaths
Norwegian feminists
Liberal Party (Norway) politicians
20th-century Norwegian economists
20th-century Norwegian politicians
20th-century Norwegian women politicians
Norwegian Association for Women's Rights people